The Thackery T. Lambshead Pocket Guide to Eccentric & Discredited Diseases (2003) is an anthology of fantasy medical conditions edited by Jeff VanderMeer and Mark Roberts, and published by Night Shade Books.

The Guide claims to be 83rd in a series of editions inaugurated by the fictional Dr. Thackery T. Lambshead in 1915, and contains generally humorous entries (in varying degrees of darkness) with disease descriptions by several popular authors such as Neil Gaiman, Alan Moore and Michael Moorcock, which together detail the "secret medical history" of the 20th century.

In 2004, the book was shortlisted for a Hugo Award for Best Related Book and a World Fantasy Award for Best Anthology.

A sequel anthology was released in 2011 called The Thackery T. Lambshead Cabinet of Curiosities, which was co-edited by Jeff VanderMeer and Anne VanderMeer.

Description

Contributors

Alan M. Clark
Alan Moore
Andrew J. Wilson
Brendan Connell
Brian Evenson
Brian Stableford
China Miéville
Cory Doctorow
David Langford
Dawn Andrews
Elliot Fintushel
G. Eric Schaller
Gahan Wilson
Gary Couzens
Harvey Jacobs
Iain Rowan
Jack Slay, Jr.
Jay Caselburg
Jeff Topham
Jeffrey Ford
Jeffrey Thomas
John Coulthart
Kage Baker
K.J. Bishop
L. Timmel Duchamp
Lance Olsen
Liz Williams
Martin Newell
Michael Barry
Michael Bishop
Michael Cisco
Michael Cobley
Michael Moorcock
Mike O'Driscoll
Nathan Ballingrud
Neil Gaiman
Neil Williamson
Paul Di Filippo
R.M. Berry
Rachel Pollack
Rhys Hughes
Richard Calder
Rikki Ducornet
Robert Freeman Wexler
Sara Gwenllian Jones
Shelley Jackson
Stepan Chapman
Steve Rasnic Tem
Steve Redwood
Tamar Yellin
Tim Lebbon

Trivia
The Thackery T. Lambshead Pocket Guide to Eccentric & Discredited Diseases makes an appearance in the novel Monstrocity by Jeffrey Thomas. It is also referenced in VanderMeer's own collection City of Saints and Madmen.

External links
 Book review at SFFWorld.com
 Four Additional (Unofficial) Entries to the Guide - A tribute by author Jordan Inman

2003 books
Fantasy anthologies
Fictional diseases and disorders
Eccentricity (behavior)